The 2002 CIS football season began on August 27, 2002, and concluded with the 38th Vanier Cup national championship on November 23 at the SkyDome in Toronto, Ontario, with the Saint Mary's Huskies winning their second consecutive championship and third overall. Twenty-six universities across Canada competed in CIS football this season, the highest level of amateur play in Canadian football, under the auspices of the Canadian Interuniversity Sport (CIS).

Awards and records

Awards 
 Hec Crighton Trophy – Tommy Denison, Queen's
 Presidents' Trophy –  Adam MacDonald, St. Francis Xavier
 Russ Jackson Award – Lincoln Blumell, Calgary Dinos
 J. P. Metras Trophy – Israel Idonije, Manitoba
 Peter Gorman Trophy – Andy Fantuz, Western Ontario

All-Canadian team 
 First team 

 Offence 
 QB Tommy Denison, Queen's
 RB Kyle Pyear, McMaster
 RB Dean Jones, St. Mary's
 WR Andy Fantuz, Western
 WR Andrew Noel, Acadia
 IR Andrew Sharp, Manitoba
 IR Brad Smith, Queen's
 OT François Boulianne, Laval
 OT Brock Flemming, Ottawa
 OG Jim Merrick, McGill
 OG Dave Forde, McMaster
 C Chris Bochen, Manitoba

 Defence 
 DE Paul Brown, StFX
 DE Stephen Young, McGill
 DT Israel Idonije, Manitoba
 DT Miguel Robede, Laval
 LB Adam MacDonald, StFX
 LB Javier Glatt, UBC
 LB Ray Mariuz, McMaster
 CB Richard Karikari, StFX
 CB Boyd Barrett, Manitoba
 DB Art Tolhurst, UBC
 DB Matthieu Proulx, Laval
 FS David Aiken, Concordia

 Special teams 
 K Jamie Boreham, Manitoba
 P Jon Ryan, Regina
 Second Team 

 Offence 
 QB Shane Munson, Manitoba
 RB Neal Hughes, Regina
 RB Nick Hoffmann, McGill
 WR Jamie Elliott, Calgary
 WR Jason Currie, St. Mary's
 IR Dave Stala, St. Mary's
 IR Blake Machan, Calgary
 OT Steve Morley, St. Mary's
 OT Fabio Filice, McMaster
 OG Darren Presley, Calgary
 OG Daniel Frame, Acadia
 C Jonathon Landon, Queen's

 Defence 
 DE Warren Doepker, Manitoba
 DE Jeet Rana, York
 DT Nicholas Comly, Acadia
 DT Tyler Lynem, Calgary
 LB Mike Mahoney, McGill
 LB Sebastien Roy, Mt Allison
 LB Joey Mikawoz, Manitoba
 CB Pascal Masson, Laval
 CB Kwame Aidoo, McMaster
 DB Dennis Mavrin, York
 DB Brandon Little, McMaster
 FS Sandy Beveridge, UBC

 Special teams 
 K Michel Ray, McMaster
 P Anand Pillai, McGill

Results

Regular-season standings 
Note: GP = Games Played, W = Wins, L = Losses, OTL = Overtime Losses, PF = Points For, PA = Points Against, Pts = Points

Teams in bold have earned playoff berths.

 Top 10 

Ranks in italics'' are teams not ranked in the top 10 poll but received votes.
NR = Not Ranked. Source:

Championships 
The Vanier Cup was played between the champions of the Mitchell Bowl and the Churchill Bowl, the national semi-final games. In 2002, the Mitchell Bowl replaced the long-standing Atlantic Bowl that had traditionally seen Huskies Stadium in Halifax host the annual game. This was done to increase competitive fairness in the CIAU. The Ontario conference's Yates Cup championship team hosted the winners of the Atlantic conference Loney Bowl championship for the Churchill Bowl. The winners of the Canada West conference Hardy Trophy visited the Dunsmore Cup Quebec champion for the Mitchell Bowl.

Vanier Cup

Notes 

U Sports football seasons
CIS football season